The 1902 Cornell Big Red football team was an American football team that represented Cornell University during the 1902 college football season.  In their second season under head coach Raymond Starbuck, the Big Red compiled an 8–3 record, shut out 7 of 11 opponents, and outscored all opponents by a combined total of 324 to 38. Guard Bill Warner was selected by Caspar Whitney as a first-team player, and by Walter Camp as a second-team player, on the 1902 College Football All-America Team.

Schedule

References

Cornell
Cornell Big Red football seasons
Cornell Big Red football